Amara Essy (born 20 December 1944) is a diplomat from Ivory Coast.

Early life and education
Essy was born in Bouaké, Ivory Coast. He received a bachelor's degree in public law and a higher education diploma in public law as well.

Diplomatic career
Essy began his professional career in 1970 as head of economic relations in the office of technical and economic cooperation. A year later, he was named first counselor of the Ivorian embassy in Brazil. He also served as counselor of the permanent mission of Côte d'Ivoire to the United Nations in New York from 1973 to 1975. He later served as permanent representative of Côte d'Ivoire to the European office of the UN in Geneva and to UNIDO in Vienna, Austria from October 1975 to September 1978. He also served as president of the Group of 77 in Geneva from 1977 to 1978 and was later named ambassador extraordinary and plenipotentiary to Switzerland. He was the Permanent Representative of Côte d'Ivoire to the United Nations from 1981 to 1990, and in January 1990 he was President of the United Nations Security Council. Simultaneously, he served as Ivorian ambassador to Argentina (1981-1983), Cuba (1988-1990). In 1990 he became Minister of Foreign Affairs, and while in that position he served as President of the 49th Session of the United Nations General Assembly from 1994 to 1995. In February 1996, he was elected the mayor of Kouassi-Datékro, serving until 2000. In 1998 he gained the rank of Minister of State from 1998 to 2000, while remaining Foreign Minister. Along with other ministers, he was detained following the military coup of 24 December 1999, but he was released on 28 December. He was replaced in the transitional government named on 4 January 2000.

On 9 July 2001 he was elected secretary-general of the Organisation of African Unity (OAU) in Lusaka, Zambia, with the task of leading the OAU's transformation into the African Union over the course of one year. He took office as secretary-general in Addis Ababa, Ethiopia on 17 September 2001. Essy served in that position until 9 July 2002, when the OAU became the African Union and he was appointed as interim Chairman of the Commission of the African Union.

Essy was initially a candidate for the post of chairman of the commission at the AU's July 2003 summit in Maputo, but he withdrew prior to the vote, leaving Alpha Oumar Konaré, the former president of Mali, as the only candidate. Essy remained interim chairman of the commission until he was succeeded by Konaré on 16 September 2003.

Essy is a member of the Global Leadership Foundation (chaired by FW de Klerk) that works to support democratic leadership, prevent and resolve conflict through mediation and promote good governance in the form of democratic institutions, open markets, human rights and the rule of law.

References

1944 births
Living people
Chairpersons of the African Union Commission
Presidents of the United Nations General Assembly
Ivorian diplomats
Permanent Representatives of Ivory Coast to the United Nations
People from Bouaké
Foreign Ministers of Ivory Coast
Ambassadors of Ivory Coast to Argentina
Ambassadors of Ivory Coast to Cuba
Ambassadors of Ivory Coast to Switzerland